Tower and Stockade was a settlement method used by Zionist settlers in Mandatory Palestine during the 1936–39 Arab Revolt. The establishment of new Jewish settlements was legally restricted by the Mandatory authorities, but the British generally gave their tacit accord to the Tower and Stockade actions as a means of countering the Arab revolt. During the course of the Tower and Stockade campaign, some 57 Jewish settlements including 52 kibbutzim and several moshavim were established throughout the country. The legal base was a Turkish Ottoman law that was in effect during the Mandate period, which stated that no illegal building may be demolished if the roof has been completed.

Background

During the Arab Revolt, these settlements provided safe havens on land that had been officially purchased by the Jewish National Fund (JNF), protected Jewish populations, particularly in remote areas, on these Jewish-owned land and maintained "facts on the ground." These settlements would eventually be transformed into fortified agricultural settlements, and served for security purposes (as defences against Arab raiders) as well as creating contiguous Jewish-populated regions, which would later help determine the borders of the UN-proposed Jewish state.
The operation was run by the Haganah and led by Moshe Sharett.
All of the major settlement groups (mostly kibbutzim and moshavim) took part in the campaign, which consisted of assembling a guard tower with a fence around it. While many of these settlements were not officially approved by the British Mandate authorities, existing settlements were not dismantled, based on the Turkish Ottoman law still valid at the time. Due to the threat of immediate attack, at least as much as to any need to comply with the clauses of this law, the construction of the Tower and Stockade settlements had to be finished very quickly, usually in the course of a single day. What is less well known is the fact that the British authorities were rather lax at implementing restrictions against such Jewish activities at a time when their main security concern was the Arab revolt, thus "Tower and Stockade" settlements were always created by day, not by night - against some still prevailing myths. In the very different political and security climate of the final months of the Mandate, a similar act of creating facts on the ground happened in April 1948 at Bror Hayil, when much of the work was indeed done during the night.

The invention of the "Tower and Stockade" (wall and tower) system is attributed to Shlomo Gur, founding member of Kibbutz Tel Amal (now Nir David), and was developed and encouraged by the architect Yohanan Ratner (see Russian-language article here ). The system was based on the fast construction of pre-fabricated wooden moulds, which would be filled with gravel and enclosed with barbed wire fencing. On average, the enclosed space formed a yard of 35 x 35 metres (1 dunam). Within this protected yard, the pre-fabricated wooden observation tower and the four sheds sheltering the initial 40 settlers were erected. The constructions were located within eyesight of neighbouring settlements and with accessibility for motor vehicles.

57 were constructed between the last days of 1936 and October 1939.

The buildings were prefabricated by Solel Boneh, the construction arm of the Jewish trade union, Histadrut.

A model of a Ḥoma u'migdal was constructed for the Land of Israel Pavilion at the 1937 World Exposition in Paris.

In 1940 two more outpost were built in the northern Hula valley, She'ar Yashuv and Beit Hillel. They, along with nearby Dafna, Dan, and the only later established Nehalim (October 1943), were known as the "Ussishkin Fortresses", named after Menachem Ussishkin, the president of the Jewish National Fund. The initial plan had been to create one "fortress" for each of the six branches of the settlement movement existing at the time. The site designated for a sixth "fortress", today's Kibbutz Snir, was only settled after the 1967 Six-Day War.

Settlements
Tower and Stockade settlements by date of establishment:

Kfar Hittim, 7 December 1936
Tel Amal (now Nir David), 10 December 1936
Sde Nahum, 5 January 1937
Sha'ar HaGolan, 31 January 1937
Masada, 31 January 1937
Ginosar, 25 February 1937
Beit Yosef, 9 April 1937
Mishmar HaShlosha, 13 April 1937
Tirat Tzvi, 30 June 1937
Moledet (called "Bnei Brit" and "Moledet-Bnei Brit" between 1944-1957), 4 July 1937
Ein HaShofet, 5 July 1937
Ein Gev, 6 July 1937
Maoz Haim, 6 July 1937
Kfar Menachem, 27 July 1937
Sha'ar HaNegev (renamed Kfar Szold before it moved altogether to the Galilee in 1942; site resettled in 1944 as Hafetz Haim), 15 August 1937
Tzur Moshe, 13 September 1937
Usha, 7 November 1937
Hanita, 21 March 1938
Shavei Tzion, 13 April 1938
Sde Warburg, 17 May 1938
Ramat Hadar, 26 May 1938
Alonim, 26 June 1938
Ma'ale HaHamisha, 17 July 1938
Tel Yitzhak, 25 July 1938
Beit Yehoshua, 17 August 1938
Ein HaMifratz, 25 August 1938
Ma'ayan Tzvi, 30 August 1938
Sharona, 16 November 1938
Geulim, 17 November 1938
Eilon, 24 November 1938
Neve Eitan, 25 November 1938
Kfar Ruppin, 25 November 1938
Kfar Masaryk, 29 November 1938
Mesilot, 22 December 1938
Ayalon (Khirbet Samach), 1 January 1939
Dalia, 2 May 1939
Dafna, 3 May 1939, as "Ussishkin Fortress 1" (Alef)
Dan, 4 May 1939, as "Ussishkin Fortress 2" (Bet)
Sde Eliyahu, 8 May 1939
Mahanayim, 23 May 1939
Shadmot Dvora, 23 May 1939
Shorashim, 23 May 1939
Hazore'im, 23 May 1939
Tel Tzur (now Moshav Nahalat Jabotinsky in Binyamina), 23 May 1939
Kfar Glikson, 23 May 1939
Ma'apilim, 23 May 1939
Mishmar HaYam (now Afek), 28 May 1939
Hamadiyah, 23 June 1939
Kfar Netter, 26 June 1939
Negba, 12 July 1939
Gesher, 13 August 1939
Beit Oren, 1 October 1939
Amir, 29 October 1939
Beit Hillel, 3 January 1940 (sometimes, but not always considered one of the "Ussishkin Fortresses")
She'ar Yashuv, February 1940, as "Ussishkin Fortress 3" (Gimel)

Gallery

See also

Three lookouts (in the Negev), 1943 settlements, created as advanced positions in southern Palestine/northern Negev
11 points in the Negev, 1946 settlements created prior to the partition of Palestine
Settlement of the Thousand, two plans (1926 and 1932) to settle Jewish families on farms in Mandate Palestine
Tegart fort, British police and border forts built during the 1930s Arab revolt
Gecekondu, legal loophole in modern Turkey allowing for permit-free night-time building

References

External links
 Homa u-Migdal Museum, Beit She'an
 Sharon Rotbard: Wall and Tower: The mold of Israeli Adrikhalut, December 17, 2008

Mandatory Palestine
Settlement schemes in Mandatory Palestine
 Yishuv during World War II
Fortifications by type
Fortified settlements
Fortified towers by type
Fortifications in Israel
Towers in Israel
Wooden towers
Wooden buildings and structures in Israel